Lamont is an unincorporated community in northeastern Greenwood County, Kansas, United States.  It is located approximately 5.5 miles east of the city of Madison along K-58 highway.

History
Lamont was laid out in about 1889.  It was previously known as La Monts Mill.

The post office at Lamont was established in February 1888.  Although Lamont is unincorporated, it has a post office, with the ZIP code of 66855.

Geography
Its elevation is 1,125 feet (343 m), and it is located at  (38.1125234, -96.0266589).

Education
The community is served by Madison–Virgil USD 386 public school district.

Lamont High School was closed through school unification. The Lamont High School mascot was Cardinals.

References

Further reading

External links
 Greenwood County maps: Current, Historic, KDOT

Unincorporated communities in Greenwood County, Kansas
Unincorporated communities in Kansas